Thomas Holt (c. 1578 – 1624), was a 17th-century English architect who designed a number of buildings at the University of Oxford.

Holt, a master carpenter and architect from either Halifax or York, is notable for designing important works in Renaissance architecture built at Oxford. He designed the whole structure of Wadham College, which was built between 1610 and 1613. As a master carpenter he was responsible for the hammerbeam roof of the Hall. From 1613 onwards he designed the great quadrangle of the examination schools there, now part of the Bodleian Library, introducing some new architectural features. Holt completed the schools quadrangle in 1624, the year of his death. Other buildings at Oxford are ascribed to him with less certainty, though he probably prepared designs for many of them.

Holt is registered as a privileged person in the university, aged 40, on 30 October 1618; he is described as "Faberlignarius Coll. Novi".  He died on 9 September 1624, and was buried in the churchyard of Holywell parish church, Oxford, where a monument was erected in his memory. His daughter married Dr. Samuel Radcliffe, principal of Brasenose College.

References

Sources
Attribution

1570s births
1624 deaths
17th-century English architects
16th-century English people
Architects from Yorkshire
English carpenters